Leonid Kozik is the former president of the Federation of Trade Unions of Belarus (FPB). Kozik was elected FPB president in 2002. Prior to assuming the FPB position, Kozik had been Deputy Head of the Presidential Administration. After the election of Kozik, FPB began receiving state subsidies in 2003.

He was a Deputy Prime Minister of Belarus from 4 February 1997 to 12 September 2001.

References

Year of birth missing (living people)
Living people
Belarusian trade unionists